Ali Raymer is an American actress. She was the original bikini woman in Yoplait's itsy bitsy yogurt campaign, the most successful General Mills ad of all time. She also appeared in the Dannon Oikos commercial "Plane Kiss" alongside  John Stamos, Vincent Gallo's short "Anemone", and Surrogates (2009).

References

External links
Official site

Year of birth missing (living people)
Living people
American television actresses
Place of birth missing (living people)
21st-century American women